Pamantasan is a Filipino word, which translates to university in the English language.  Several local universities (or universities funded by municipal or city government) in the Philippines are called Pamantasan.

In 1965, Pamantasan ng Lungsod ng Maynila, the first Philippine university funded by a municipal government, was founded.  It is also the same educational institution to have first used the term Pamantasan as part of its official name.

Other municipalities and cities emulated the PLM, but it was only after the approval and subsequent implementation of the Local Government Code (R.A. 7160) in 1991 that it became feasible for them to establish their own community or local university.  At present, the PLM, being considered as one of the top five universities in the Philippines, are in consortium with other locally funded educational institutions to help them in their curricular offerings and academic programs.  The President of PLM, Atty. Adel A. Tamano is also the President the Association of Local Colleges and Universities.

List of Pamantasan-named universities
Pamantasan ng Bayan ng San Mateo
Pamantasan ng Cabuyao
Pamantasan ng Lungsod ng Marikina
Pamantasan ng Lungsod ng Maynila
Pamantasan ng Montalban
Pamantasan ng Lungsod ng Muntinlupa
Pamantasan ng Lungsod ng Pasig
Pamantasan ng Lungsod ng Valenzuela

References

Tagalog words and phrases
Higher education in the Philippines
Local colleges and universities in the Philippines